John II of Nassau-Wiesbaden-Idstein (born: 1419; died: 9 May 1480) was a son of Adolph II, Count of Nassau-Wiesbaden-Idstein and his wife Margarete of Baden, a daughter of Margrave Bernard I, Margrave of Baden-Baden en Anna of Oettingen.  After his father's death in 1426, he ruled Nassau-Wiesbaden and Nassau-Idstein.

Marriage and issue
In 1437, he married Mary (1418-1472), daughter of Engelbert I of Nassau.
They had the following children:
 Maria (1438–1480), married in 1452 to Louis II of Isenburg
 John (1439–1480)
 Margarete (d. 1486)
 Anna (d. 1480), married in 1466 Otto II of Solms-Braunfels
 Adolf III (1443–1511), his successor in Nassau-Wiesbaden
 Bertha (b. 1446)
 Engelbert (1448–1508)
 Philip (1450–1509), his successor in Nassau-Idstein
 Anna

After his death, the inheritance was divided: Adolf III received Wiesbaden; Philip received Idstein.  When Philip died childless in 1509, Idstein reverted to Adolf.

House of Nassau
Counts of Nassau
1419 births
1480 deaths
15th-century German people